The Outer Ring Road is a  long semi ring road laid around the South Indian city of Erode in Tamil Nadu. It also acts as a southern Bypass to Erode and connects the suburban areas in Namakkal district with the city core areas.

The state government of Tamil Nadu has sanctioned the project in 2006, with a funding of 85 crore, with a land acquisition of 180 acres. Among which, 30 crore will be given as compensation for 120 acres of private patta land.

Traffic in the City
Erode, being the district headquarters and a major marketing hub in the region, has an extensive network of radial roads originating from core city and the growth of the city is along these transport corridors. This results in the rapid increase in traffic congestion inside the core city. Also, the number of trucks entering the city is significantly high. The narrow and congested city roads does not cater to the increasing traffic needs. This paved the need for developing better road infrastructure for vehicles travelling across Erode.

The four-laned National Highway 544 (NH–544) connecting Salem with Kochi has been strategically planned and constructed along the western periphery of the city through Lakshmi Nagar, Chithode, Gangapuram and Nasiyanur areas to reach Perundurai, is a natural bypass for Erode in the west. Due to the presence of this highway, the growth pattern of the city is in North-west direction. Vehicles from Erode city can access this highway through the arterial roads like Sathy road, Bhavani road, Nasiyanur road and Perundurai Road. But still the traffic due to the vehicles flowing from South and East of the City makes traffic worse. So, the demand raised for the construction of Outer Ring Road for the city.

Ring formation around the city

The outer ring road around the city is laid along the southern suburbs, with a plan to connect with the NH–544 western by-pass near Nasiyanur, which further connects Chithode, Bhavani and to Komarapalayam in Namakkal district in the west. The road is expected to divert around 2200 trucks and buses away from the city roads. This stretch linking Kokkarayanpet with Bhavani will make a semi-circular ring around the city.

Also, the access to the fast growing urban nodes located in the eastern side of Kaveri river like Pallipalayam, Sankagiri and Tiruchengode is limited with a single Cauvery Bridge. The Comprehensive Mobility Plan submitted by Erode City Municipal Corporation suggests networking of road to these areas for better transit. With the networking of these eastern areas, the ring formation would be made complete.

Phases of construction 
The Outer Ring Road project is executed in sections as a Semi Ring Road.

Kokkarayanpettai - Thindal Chinnamedu
This Semi Outer Ring road or Southern Bypass Road is 15 km long, starts from Kokkarayanpet in Namakkal district and ends near Nanjanapuram near Thindal on Perundurai Road in Erode. The road is laid for a width of 7 meters (2 lane road) with a provision of expansion for up to 30 meters. This stretch is constructed in three phases
 Phase-I starting from Kokkarayanpet in the east and ends near Parisalthurai along Karur Road has been constructed at a cost of 12 crore. This stretch includes a high-level bridge across Kaveri River and a level-crossing on Erode-Tiruchirappalli line.
 Phase-II of the road connecting Karur Road with Anaikkalpalayam on Kangeyam Road through 46 Pudur constructed at a cost of 25 crore, intersects NH-381A (Vellakoil Road) near Lakkapuram.
 Phase-III of the road connecting Anaikkalapalayam along Poondurai Road with Thindal Chinnamedu along Perundurai Road covering a length of 7.2 km including the Railway over bridge near Jeeva Nagar at a cost of 69.3 crore as completed and opened during February 2021. 
The 14.8 km stretch of the road under phase-I, II & III has been opened for public to transit between Kokkarayanpet and Thindal Chinnamedu. The phase-III also includes widening of the 2-lane stretch under phase-I & II into a 4-lane road of 30 meters width.

Proposed Extensions

West side: Thindal Chinnamedu - Chithode 
This proposed western section of the Outer Ring road is planned to connect Perundurai Road with Sathy road near Chithode which can further connect  NH-544 Western Bypass. In 2015, the Highways department has prepared a proposal to connect Nanjanapuram near Thindal with Chithode, which will further connect Bhavani via NH 544. 

Recently in 2022, the state government started preparing a detailed project report at an estimate of Rs.60 lakhs for the extension of Outer Ring Road from Perundurai road to connect Nasiyanur road and Sathy road for an approximate length of 10 km.

East side: Kokkarayanpet - Kadachanallur - Veppadai
The Eastern section of Outer Ring Road planned from Kokkarayanpet Parisalthurai to Veppadai via Kadachanallur (11 km) is expected to be implemented as a part of the 4-laning project of Vellakoil-Erode-Sankagiri NH 381A under Bharatmala Pariyojana Scheme.

Satellite Ring Road
The Comprehensive Mobility Plan prepared for Erode Local Planning Area has proposed the development of a new Satellite Ring Road connecting Pasur-Modakkurichi-Vellode-Perundurai-Kanjikoil-Periyapuliyur-Bhavani Urachikottai running for a length of around 60 km.

References 

Transport in Erode
Roads in Tamil Nadu
Ring roads in India